Aharon Kapitulnik (born 1953) is an Israeli-American experimental condensed matter physicist working at Stanford University. He is known primarily for his work on strongly correlated electron systems, low dimensional electronic systems, unconventional superconductors, topological superconductors, superconductivity and magnetism, transport in bad metals and precision measurements.

Education and Career

Kapitulnik studied physics at Tel Aviv University in Israel (BA 1978, PhD 1983). After completing his doctoral studies under supervision of Guy Deutscher on the physics of disorder he moved to United States to work on polymers as a postdoc scholar in the group of Alan Heeger at UC Santa Barbara. In 1985 he joined the faculty of the Department of Applied Physics of Stanford University where he became a Professor Applied Physics and Physics in 1994.

At Stanford Kapitulnik formed a close collaboration with Theodore Geballe and Malcolm Beasley which is known collectively as the "KGB group". Many of its graduates went on to establish successful academic careers in US and around the world.

Awards
Kapitulnik is the Theodore and Sydney Rosenberg Professor in Applied Physics at Stanford University and the Sackler Professor by Special Appointment at Tel Aviv University. He is a Member of the National Academy of Sciences, a Fellow of American Academy of Arts and Sciences and a Fellow of the American Physical Society. He was awarded the 2015 Oliver E. Buckley Condensed Matter Prize of the American Physical Society for the "discovery and pioneering investigations of the superconductor-insulator transition, a paradigm for quantum phase transitions" and 2009 Heike Kamerlingh-Onnes Prize for "seminal studies of time-reversal-symmetry breaking effects in unconventional superconductors using magneto optics".

References

1953 births
Living people
Stanford University faculty
21st-century American physicists
Tel Aviv University alumni
Academic staff of Tel Aviv University
Members of the United States National Academy of Sciences
Fellows of the American Physical Society
Oliver E. Buckley Condensed Matter Prize winners